G. A. Pratapkumar (born 17 September 1956) is a former Indian cricketer and umpire. He stood in two ODI games between 1998 and 2001.

See also
 List of One Day International cricket umpires

References

External links

1956 births
Living people
Indian One Day International cricket umpires
People from Nellore district
Indian cricketers
Andhra cricketers
Cricketers from Andhra Pradesh